The Sense of Style: The Thinking Person's Guide to Writing in the 21st Century is a 2014 English style guide written by cognitive scientist, linguist and popular science author Steven Pinker. Building upon earlier guides, such as Strunk & White's The Elements of Style and Fowler's A Dictionary of Modern English Usage, it applies science to the process of writing, and explains its prescriptions by citing studies in related fields – e.g., grammatical phenomena, mental dynamics, and memory load – as well as history and criticism, to "distinguish the rules that enhance clarity, grace, and emotional resonance from those that are based on myths and misunderstandings".

Pinker's prescriptions combine data from ballots given to the Usage Panel of the American Heritage Dictionary, the usage notes of several dictionaries and style guides, the historical analyses in Merriam–Webster's Dictionary of English Usage, the meta-analysis in Roy Copperud's American Usage and Style: The Consensus, and views from modern linguistics represented in The Cambridge Grammar of the English Language and the blog Language Log.

Contents

Prologue
"Style" is the effective use of words to engage the human mind. Style manuals that are innocent of linguistics are crippled in dealing with the aspect of writing that evokes the most emotion: correct and incorrect usage. Orthodox stylebooks are ill-equipped to deal with a fundamental fact about language: it changes over time. Language is not a protocol legislated by an authority but rather an evolving set of tacit standards from the contributions of millions of writers and speakers.

Good writing
Reverse-engineering good prose as the key to developing a writerly ear – The starting point for becoming a good writer is to be a good reader. Good writers are avid readers. They have absorbed a vast inventory of words, idioms, constructions, tropes, and rhetorical tricks, and with them a sensitivity to how they mesh and how they clash. This is the elusive "ear" of a skilled writer – the tacit sense of style which cannot be explicitly taught.

A window onto the world
Classic style as an antidote for academese, bureaucratese, corporatese, legalese, officialese, and other kinds of stuffy prose – The key to good style, far more than obeying any list of commandments, is to have a clear conception of the make-believe world in which you're pretending to communicate. A writer of classic prose must simulate two experiences: showing the reader something in the world, and engaging the reader in conversation. Classic style is an ideal. Not all prose should be classic, and not all writers can carry off the pretense. But knowing the hallmarks of classic style will make anyone a better writer, and it is "the strongest cure for the disease that enfeebles academic, bureaucratic, corporate, legal, and official prose".

The curse of knowledge
The main cause of incomprehensible prose is the curse of knowledge – the difficulty of imagining what it is like for someone else not to know something that you know. Be aware of specific pitfalls that it sets in your path, e.g., the use of jargon, abbreviations, and technical vocabulary. Show a draft to some people who are similar to your intended audience, and find out whether they can follow it. Show a draft to yourself, after enough time has passed that the text is no longer familiar. Rework and revise.

The web, the tree, and the string
Understanding syntax can help a writer avoid ungrammatical, convoluted, and misleading prose – Learning how to bring the units of language into consciousness can allow writers to reason their way to grammatically consistent sentences, and to diagnose problems. Grammar is a fascinating subject in its own right, when it is properly explained.

Arcs of coherence
How to ensure that readers will grasp the topic, get the point, keep track of the players, and see how one idea follows from another – Even if every sentence in a text is crisp, lucid, and well formed, a succession of them can feel choppy, disjointed, unfocused, incoherent. A coherent text is a designed object: an ordered tree of sections within sections, crisscrossed by arcs that track topics, points, actors, and themes, and held together by connectors that tie one proposition to the next. Like other designed objects, it comes about not by accident but by drafting a blueprint, attending to details, and maintaining a sense of harmony and balance.

Telling right from wrong
How to make sense of the rules of correct grammar, word choice, and punctuation – The idea that there are exactly two approaches to usage – all the traditional rules must be followed, or else anything goes – is a myth. The first step in mastering usage is to understand why the myth is wrong. There is no such thing as a "language war" between prescriptivists and descriptivists. "The alleged controversy is as bogus as other catchy dichotomies such as nature versus nurture and America: Love It or Leave It." The key is to recognize that the rules of usage are tacit conventions. A convention is an agreement among the members of a community to abide by a single way of doing things. Linguists capture their regularities in "descriptive rules" – that is, rules that describe how people speak and understand. A subset of these conventions is less widespread and natural, but has become accepted by a smaller community of literate speakers for use in public forums such as government, journalism, literature, business, and academia. These conventions are "prescriptive rules" – rules that prescribe how one ought to speak and write in these forums. Unlike the descriptive rules, many of the prescriptive rules have to be stated explicitly, because they are not second nature to most writers: the rules may not apply in the spoken vernacular, or they may be difficult to implement in complicated sentences which tax the writer's memory. This raises the question of how a careful writer can distinguish a legitimate rule of usage from a tall tale. The answer: look it up. Pinker includes a short guide to a hundred of the most commonly raised issues of grammar, word usage, and punctuation. (For Pinker's Top 10 list, see .)

Reception
The Sense of Style won Plain English Campaign's International Award for 2014, and was ranked among the best books of 2014 by  The Economist, The Sunday Times, and Amazon. It received mainly positive reviews from several major publications, including The New York Times, Scientific American, and The Washington Post, and a negative review from The New Yorker. The Telegraph states Pinker "doesn't have anything new to say" and criticizes Pinker for allegedly "logrolling" in his choice of which authors to quote.

References

External links
The Sense of Style on stevenpinker.com

Works by Steven Pinker
Style guides for American English
Style guides for British English
Grammar books
2014 non-fiction books
Penguin Books books